The Amateurliga Nordbaden was the highest football league in the region of the North Baden Football Association and the third tier of the German football league system from its inception in 1945 to the formation of the Oberliga Baden-Württemberg and the Verbandsliga Nordbaden below it in 1978.

Overview 
The Amateurliga Nordbaden was formed in 1945 in the northern half of the then-state of Württemberg-Baden, which is now the northwestern part of the German state of Baden-Württemberg. It was a feeder league to the Oberliga Süd and therefore the second tier of the football league system in the south of West Germany until the inception of the 2. Oberliga Süd in 1950. From 1950 until the establishment of the Oberliga Baden-Württemberg in 1978, it was the third tier of the football league system.

The winner of the Amateurliga Nordbaden was not automatically promoted but rather had to take part in a promotion play-off to its league above. Usually, the champion would have to compete with the winners of the Amateurligas Südbaden, Württemberg and (from 1961) Schwarzwald-Bodensee.

The separation of North Baden and South Baden resulted from the outcome of World War II when the state was split into two separate occupation zones. The north was in the US zone and the south in the French zone. The official names for the two FAs reflect the separation of Südbaden from the originally association, with Nordbaden just simply calling itself Baden FA.

The league was established in 1945 with ten teams, the winner gaining promotion to the Oberliga Süd. The founder members were:

VfL Neckarau
VfB Knielingen
VfB Mühlburg
VfR Pforzheim
ASV Feudenheim
SpVgg Sandhofen
Amicitia Viernheim
FV Daxlanden
Phönix Mannheim
1. FC Pforzheim

The league was split into a northern and a southern group from 1946 to 1948.

With the introduction of the Bundesliga in 1963 the Amateurliga was placed below the new Regionalliga Süd but still retained its third-tier status.
It continued to do so after the introduction of the 2. Bundesliga Süd in 1974.

The longest continuous member of the league was the SV Sandhausen which gained promotion to it in 1957 and spent 21 seasons in it until its admittance to the new Oberliga in 1978. The VfR Pforzheim spent a record of 28 out of 33 possible seasons in the league.

Disbanding of the Amateurliga Nordbaden 
In 1978, the Oberliga Baden-Württemberg was formed to allow direct promotion to the 2. Bundesliga Süd for the Amateure champion of the state. The teams placed one to five gained entry to the Oberliga while the other eleven teams were put into the new Verbandsliga Nordbaden, now the fourth tier of the football league system.

Admitted to the new Oberliga:

FV 09 Weinheim
SV Sandhausen
1. FC Pforzheim
VfR Mannheim
SV Neckargerach

Relegated to the new Verbandsliga:

SV Schwetzingen
VfB Eppingen
VfR Pforzheim
Karlsruher SC II
VfL Neckarau
VfB Bretten
FVgg Weingarten
SpVgg Neckarelz
Germania Mönchzell
VfB Knielingen
Alemannia Eggenstein

Winners of the Amateurliga Nordbaden 

 Bold denotes team gained promotion.
 In 1950, three teams were promoted to the new 2. Oberliga Süd.
 In 1965 the VfR Pforzheim gained promotion as runners-up as the reserves team of Karlsruher SC was ineligible.

References

Sources
 Deutschlands Fußball in Zahlen,  An annual publication with tables and results from the Bundesliga to Verbandsliga/Landesliga, publisher: DSFS
 kicker Almanach,  The yearbook on German football from Bundesliga to Oberliga, since 1937, published by the kicker Sports Magazine
 Süddeutschlands Fussballgeschichte in Tabellenform 1897–1988  History of Southern German football in tables, publisher & author: Ludolf Hyll
 Die Deutsche Liga-Chronik 1945–2005  History of German football from 1945 to 2005 in tables, publisher: DSFS, published: 2006

External links 
 Das deutsche Fussball Archiv  Historic German league tables
 Fussball.de: Verbandsliga Nordbaden  
 BFV: Baden Football Association 

1945 establishments in Germany
1978 disestablishments in West Germany
Football competitions in Baden-Württemberg
Defunct association football leagues in Germany
Ger
Sports leagues established in 1945